Frederick William Hammond (born December 27, 1960) is an American gospel singer, bass guitar player, and record producer. He is regarded as one of the most popular figures in contemporary gospel music. He is known for using a variety of different styles in his music such as R&B, hip-hop, and disco.

Musical career
Hammond has been active both as a member of the gospel performing group Commissioned, and as a solo artist (currently for Verity Records). He is a multiple Grammy, Dove, and Stellar award winner and nominee as a performer, producer, and writer.

Hammond first gained recognition while playing bass guitar for the gospel group The Winans. By 1985, he was one of the six original members of the group Commissioned, participating in 10 of the group's 12 albums.

After his time with Commissioned ended, he regained fame in the gospel community after selling millions of albums with his musical group Radical For Christ.

In 2002, Hammond returned to the group Commissioned (now with members Keith Staten, Marvin Sapp, Mitchell Jones, Karl Reid, Michael Williams, and Marcus Cole) to produce the Commissioned Reunion Live album.

Hammond produced "Make Me Like the Moon", a gospel ballad co-written by Chanté Moore and Kenny Lattimore for their 2006 double-CD of gospel and R&B love songs entitled Uncovered/Covered (released October 10, 2006, by LaFace/Verity/Zomba Music Group). He also performs with Sean Combs on the unreleased album, Thank You.

Discography

Albums 
{| class="wikitable sortable"
|-
!align="left"|Release date
!align="left"|Album
!align="left"|Label
!align="left"|RIAA certification
|-
| 1985
| I'm Going On (Commissioned)
| Light Records
| 
|-
| 1986
| Go Tell Somebody (Commissioned)
| Light Records
| 
|-
| 1987
| On The Winning Side (Commissioned)
| Light Records
| 
|-
| 1988
| Will You Be Ready? (Commissioned)
| Light Records
| 
|-
| 1989
| Ordinary Just Won't Do (Commissioned)
| Light Records
| 
|-
| 1990
| State of Mind (Commissioned)
| Verity Records
| 
|-
| 1991
| Number 7 (Commissioned)
| A&M Records
| 
|-
|  1991
| I Am Persuaded
| Verity Records, Benson Records
| 
|-
|  1993
| Deliverance
| A&M Records
| 
|-
| 1994
| Matters of the Heart (Commissioned)
| A&M Records
| 
|-
| 1995
| The Inner Court (Radical for Christ)
| Benson Records
| 
|-
| December 1, 1995
| Gospel Greats (Commissioned)
| Benson Records
| 
|-
| August 20, 1996
| The Spirit of David (Radical for Christ)
| Benson Records
| Gold - 
|-
| April 28, 1998
| Pages of Life - Chapters I & II (Radical for Christ)
| Verity Records
|  Gold - Platinum - 2× Platinum - 
|-
| March 21, 2000
| Purpose By Design (Radical for Christ)
| Verity Records
| Gold - 
|-
| March 6, 2001
| In Case You Missed It....And Then Some
| Verity Records
| 
|-
| September 11, 2001
| Christmas...Just Remember
| Verity Records
| 
|-
| April 23, 2002
| The Commissioned Reunion Live (Commissioned)
| Verity Records
| 
|-
| September 10, 2002
| Speak Those Things: POL Chapter 3
| Verity Records
| 
|-
| September 9, 2003
| Hooked on the Hits
| Verity Records
| 
|-
| June 8, 2004
| Somethin' 'Bout Love
| Verity Records
|align="left'"|Gold - November 7, 2008
|-
| June 13, 2006
| Praise & Worship (Commissioned)
| Verity/Legacy
| 
|-
| October 3, 2006
| Free to Worship| Verity Records
| 
|-
| September 29, 2009
| Love Unstoppable| Verity Gospel Music Group
| 
|-
| January 31, 2012
| God, Love & Romance| Verity Gospel Music Group 
| 
|-
| March 26, 2013
| United Tenors| RCA Records
|
|-
| November 17, 2014
| I Will Trust| RCA Records
|
|-
| September 30, 2016
| Worship Journal Live| Provident Label Group, RCA Records
|
|-
| May 11, 2018
| Uncle Fred - Texture of a Man - Collectors Edition| Provident Label Group, Face To Face Productions
|
|}

 Notable singles 

Billboard chart history

Albums

Awards

Award wins

Award nominations

Personal life
Hammond has two children who have appeared on his 2009 album, Love Unstoppable. Hammond divorced his wife of 18 years, Kim, in 2004, and he currently resides in Cedar Hill, Texas.

Hammond revealed on the Donnie McClurkin Show'' that his mother confessed to him three months before she died that she tried to get an abortion when she was pregnant with him, and the procedure, done in 1960, before abortions were legal, failed. Hammond's mother returned for a second attempt but decided against the procedure; Hammond was later born in December 1960.

One of Hammond's nephews is guard Emmanuel Mudiay.

References

External links

Living people
African-American guitarists
American gospel singers
Urban contemporary gospel musicians
Singers from Detroit
1960 births
People from Cedar Hill, Texas
20th-century American bass guitarists
20th-century African-American musicians
21st-century African-American people